Križpolje is a village in the Lika-Senj County, Croatia. The settlement is administered as a part of Brinje municipality.
According to national census of 2001, population of the settlement is 655.

Sources

Populated places in Lika-Senj County